Agonopterix abjectella is a moth in the family Depressariidae. It was described by Hugo Theodor Christoph in 1882. It is found in south-eastern Siberia and on the Kuriles.

References

Moths described in 1882
Agonopterix
Moths of Asia
Taxa named by Hugo Theodor Christoph